Alessandro Campagna may refer to:

 Alessandro Campagna (kickboxer) (born 1991), Italian welterweight kickboxer
 Alessandro Campagna (water polo) (born 1963), Italian Olympic water polo player